The Kazakhstan national football team (Qazaqstan Ūlttyq Futbol qūramasy) represents Kazakhstan in men's international football and it is governed by the Kazakhstan Football Federation. They split from the Soviet Union national football team after independence in 1991 and joined the Asian Football Confederation's Central Asian Football Federation. After failing to qualify for the 1998 and 2002 FIFA World Cups, they joined UEFA, but are yet to qualify for a FIFA World Cup or a UEFA European Championship.

History

AFC member (1992–2002)
The country of Kazakhstan declared independence from the Soviet Union on 16 December 1991. Its national team then split from the Soviet Union national football team (a UEFA member) and joined the Asian Football Confederation. At the time, they were one of strongest teams in Central Asia, and one of the most improving teams in Asia.

The team played their first match against another former-Soviet debutant, Turkmenistan, on June 1, 1992, as part of a Central Asian tournament. Kazakhstan won 1–0. The tournament also saw the footballing debuts of Uzbekistan, Kyrgyzstan and Tajikistan. After beating Libya in a friendly in North Korea on 3 July, Kazakhstan played the remainder of its Central Asian fixtures and avoided defeat in all of them. They beat Uzbekistan 1–0 at home on 16 July, then drew 1–1 away in Turkmenistan on 14 September, in Kyrgyzstan on 26 September and Uzbekistan on 14 October. The final match was a 2–0 home victory over Kyrgyzstan on 25 October.

Kazakhstan entered qualification for the first time in the attempt to reach the 1998 FIFA World Cup. In the first round they were placed in Group 9 alongside Pakistan and Iraq. Kazakhstan's first qualifying match was won 3–0 at home in Almaty on 11 May 1997, against Pakistan. On 6 June they travelled to Baghdad to face Iraq and won 2–1, then five days later won an away match against Pakistan, 7–0 in Lahore. The result remains Kazakhstan's biggest-ever international win. They retained their 100% start to World Cup football by beating Iraq at home 3–1 on 29 June.

In the second and final round of qualification, Kazakhstan came last in the group. Their only victory was on October 18, 1997, when they beat the United Arab Emirates 3–0 at home. Kazakhstan drew three other games – all at home (versus Uzbekistan, Japan and South Korea).

In the first round of Asian qualifying, Kazakhstan were placed in Group 6 alongside Iraq, Nepal and Macau. All games in the group were to be held in Almaty, Kazakhstan, after Nepal failed to organise matches in Kathmandu in March 2001. After an Iraqi protest, the first three games for each team were moved to Baghdad, Iraq.

Kazakhstan started off well in Baghdad by beating Nepal 6–0 with two goals by Oleg Litvinenko on 12 April, and Macau 3–0 two days later. On 16 April they held Iraq to a 1–1 draw in front of 50,000. Ruslan Baltiev put the Kazakhs in front in the 6th minute and Abdul-Wahab Abu Al-Hail equalised with a penalty in the 31st.

In Almaty Central Stadium, Kazakhstan beat Nepal 3–0 with two goals by Maksim Igorevich Shevchenko on 21 April. Two days later they beat Macau 5–0, Dmitriy Byakov and Igor Avdeyev scored two each after a goalless first half. The final game on 25 April saw a 1–1 draw against Iraq in front of 25,000. Litvinenko put Kazakhstan ahead in the 32nd but Iraq equalised ten minutes later. Despite being level on points, Iraq advanced on goal difference mainly due to a 9–1 victory over Nepal.

UEFA member (2002–present)
Being a transcontinental country, Kazakhstan joined UEFA in 2002. They had to wait until the 2002 FIFA World Cup finished on June 30 before making the switch, as they had entered the tournament as an AFC member. Kazakhstan therefore could not enter qualification for UEFA Euro 2004, as the draw had been made on 25 January 2002. Since joining UEFA, Kazakhstan has been a relative minnow within the continent, with most of their qualifications being unsuccessful and often finish near dead last or bottom.

In the 2006 FIFA World Cup qualification, now as members of UEFA, Kazakhstan was placed in the last drawing pot with Andorra and Luxembourg, being placed in Group 2 alongside Turkey, Denmark, future UEFA Euro 2004 winners Greece, Ukraine, Georgia and Albania.

Their first official UEFA match was on 8 September 2004 and ended in a home defeat by 2–1 against Ukraine. Kazakhstan lost their next 9 matches, including a 6–0 home defeat against Turkey, their tied-biggest defeat up to 2018 and conceding a home defeat to Greece into four minutes of the stoppage time. Their sole point of the qualifying came in the next match, on 8 October 2005, in a 0–0 away draw against Georgia played behind closed doors, before losing the last match at home against Denmark.

For the UEFA Euro 2008 qualifying, Kazakhstan was once again placed in the last drawing pot. Their campaign started with two away draws against Belgium (0–0) and Azerbaijan (1–1). They lost the next three matches before getting their first official win as UEFA members in a 2–1 home triumph against Serbia with goals from Kairat Ashirbekov and Nurbol Zhumaskaliyev. After a home loss against Armenia, Kazakhstan got their sixth and seventh points after drawing again with Azerbaijan (1–1) and Belgium (2–2), both at home. Losses against Poland and Portugal were followed by their second win, this time away from home, with Sergei Ostapenko scoring the winning goal against Armenia. Their last match was a delayed game against Serbia, ending in defeat. In the end, Kazakhstan finished with 10 points and in 6th out of the 8 Group A teams.

The 2010 FIFA World Cup qualification had Kazakhstan in the 5th of 6 drawing pots, drawn in Group 6 with Croatia, England, Ukraine, Belarus and Andorra. They started the campaign with a 3–0 home win against Andorra on 20 August 2008. However, that was the only opponent they managed to get points from, after they won the reverse fixture 3–1 on 9 September 2009 and losing all the other group matches. Kazakhstan finished in 5th, ahead only of Andorra, who lost all of their matches.

Kazakhstan was drawn in the Group A of the UEFA Euro 2012 qualifying and lost the first five matches without managing to score a single goal before defeating Azerbaijan on 3 June 2011 by 2–1 with two goals from Sergey Gridin. They lost their next three games before ending the qualifying with a goalless home draw against Austria. They ended in the last place with 4 points, three behind Azerbaijan.

Following recent unimpressive qualifying campaigns, Kazakhstan was once again in the last drawing pot for the 2014 FIFA World Cup qualification. Their campaign in Group C started with two defeats before getting their first point in a goalless home draw against Austria on 12 October 2012. Losses to Austria and twice to Germany were followed by their first and only win of the qualification by 2–1 against Faroe Islands on 6 September 2013. They still got a fifth point in a 1–1 away drawn against the same opponents. Kazakhstan finished in 5th place, ahead only of the Faroese.

The UEFA Euro 2016 qualifying had Kazakhstan once more in the last drawing pot. Their first match was a home 0–0 draw against Latvia on 9 September 2014, followed by six consecutive losses before another goalless draw, away from home, against Iceland. After their seventh defeat of the qualifying, Kazakhstan ended the campaign with a 1–0 away win against Latvia on 13 October 2015. The goal scored by Islambek Kuat got the Kazakhs the 5th place, tied in points with the Latvians, but with a better head-to-head record.

Once again in the last drawing pot, Kazakhstan had an unimpressive 2018 FIFA World Cup qualification campaign, failing to win a single match. After two home draws against Poland and Romania in their first three matches, Kazakhstan lost their following six matches, ending the qualifying with a 1–1 home draw against Armenia and finishing last in Group E.

For the 2018–19 UEFA Nations League, Kazakhstan was in Pot 3 of League D, the fourth and lowest division of the UEFA Nations League. Drawn in Group 1 with Georgia, Latvia and Andorra, their campaign started with a 2–0 home loss against group winners Georgia. Away draws against Andorra and Latvia had Georgia with 9 points after the three first matches, with all the other teams tied with 2 points. Kazakhstan defeated Andorra by 4–0 on 16 October, but the Georgia win against Latvia got the Georgians promoted to League C with two matches still to be played. Their sixth and last point came in a 1–1 home draw against Latvia, before being defeated by Georgia in the last group match and finishing in the second place of the group.

The UEFA Euro 2020 qualifying for Kazakhstan once again was unsuccessful, with the team continued to fail in the qualification due to being inferior to Russia and Belgium. However, Kazakhstan won ten points in the qualification, its best performance up to date in any Euro qualifications, including a shock 3–0 home win over Scotland, and a 1–1 away draw over Cyprus, though they still finished fifth at the end.

Kits

Kit suppliers

Source: FootballShirtsVoltage.com

Rivalries
Though currently an UEFA member, Kazakhstan's best rivalries are mostly with AFC members from Central Asia, namely Uzbekistan, Tajikistan, Kyrgyzstan and Turkmenistan. The Hawks' two biggest rivals are Uzbekistan and Kyrgyzstan, which dates back from early USSR rule. These rivalries are still of great importance for many Kazakhs, since Kazakhstan does not have any real rivalry with any UEFA national team.

Results and fixtures

https://www.worldfootball.net/teams/kasachstan-team/21/

2022

2023

Coaches
Russian manager Magomed Adiyev is the current head coach of Kazakhstan national team. He was named a manager on 6 May 2022. In November 2022, the contract was extended for another 2 years.

Coaching history

Players

Current squad
 The following players were called up for the friendlies.
 Match dates: 16 and 19 November 2022
 Opposition:  and 
 Caps and goals correct as of:' 19 November 2022, after the match against 

Recent call-ups
The following players have also been called up to the Kazakhstan's squad in the last 12 months.

DQ Banned from football for several months/years.
PRE Preliminary squad.
INJ Injured after call up squad.
SUS Suspended for the next match.
WD Player was withdrawn from the roster for non-injury related reasons.
RET Retired from the national team.

Player recordsPlayers in bold are still active with Kazakhstan.''

Most appearances

Top goalscorers

Competitive record

FIFA World Cup

UEFA European Championship

UEFA Nations League

AFC Asian Cup

Asian Games

WAFF West Asian Championship

Record versus other countries

See also

 Football in Kazakhstan

References

External links

 Official website

 
European national association football teams
Asian national association football teams